is a fictional creature in the Pokémon franchise, designed by Megumi Mizutani for the 2016 video game Pokémon Sun and Moon. It is referred to as the "disguise Pokémon" in the series due to its appearance resembling a rag form of Pikachu.

According to Pokédex entries, Mimikyu are friendly creatures who wear the disguise in order to seek affection from humans within the Pokémon world. However in the animated series Mimikyu is shown to be hostile towards Pikachu, often fighting the other Pokémon on sight.

Design and characteristics 

Mimikyu is a small Pokémon, standing 8 inches (0.2 m) tall, and is hidden underneath a tattered cloak that is said to be made of straw. The cloak is shaped like Pikachu, with black eyes, red cheeks, a black mouth, a lightning bolt-shaped stick that resembles a tail, and ears that are black on the top. A pair of beady black eyes can be seen in the lower area of its costume, and a vague semblance of a lower body can be seen at its costume's hem. During some attacks, it will occasionally extend a black appendage from beneath the disguise.

The cloak is so shabby and worn that it is almost unrecognizable as Pikachu, but Mimikyu wears it in the hopes of being loved and accepted, as its true form is said to be too horrifying to behold.

Appearances

Pokémon video games 
Mimikyu first appears in Pokémon Sun and Moon as a dual-type Ghost/Fairy Pokémon. It changes its appearance when hit by an attack. Its ability, "Disguise", allows it to avoid damage from an enemy attack once during a battle. In Ultra Sun and Ultra Moon, Mimikyu can use an exclusive Fairy-type Z move, "Let's Snuggle Forever", that requires Mimikyu to know the move "Play Rough" and hold a Mimikium Z. It can be found on Ula'ula Island in the Abandoned Thrifty Megamart. It appears as a totem Pokémon in both Sun and Moon, and Ultra Sun and Ultra Moon.

Mimikyu appears in Pokémon Sword and Shield during foggy weather, in a section of the Wild Area named Giant's Mirror. Mimikyu is also present in Pokémon Scarlet and Violet, found near ruins and in a forest called Tagtree Thicket. 

Mimikyu also appears in Pokémon Rumble Rush, Pokémon Shuffle, Pokémon Masters EX, Pokkén Tournament DX and Pokémon Go.

The Pokémon anime 
Mimikyu appears in the anime Pokémon: Sun & Moon, encountered by Jessie, James and Meowth of Team Rocket. Meowth, being able to understand Mimikyu, is terrified by the unheard horrifying things it says. When the two of them begin to battle, Meowth lifts Mimikyu's disguise, and is nearly killed by the sight of its true appearance. It later allies with Team Rocket when it sees them fighting Ash Ketchum's Pikachu, expressing its hatred for Pikachu as the reason it emulates the Pokémon's appearance.

Mimikyu also made a short appearance in the anime Pokémon Journeys: The Series, in the episode "That New Old Gang of Mine!" In the episode, when Ash and Pikachu are searching for their friend Goh, Mimikyu can be found in the foreground carrying a Pinap berry, alongside a Bewear, Stufful, and Mareanie.

Other appearances 
Mimikyu appears in a music video rapping about itself that was uploaded to the official Pokémon YouTube channel, in Japanese. Mimikyu also starred alongside Scraggy in a Looney Tunes-styled animation short uploaded to the Japanese Pokémon Kids TV YouTube channel.

Mimikyu makes an appearance in the 16th chapter of the manga Pokémon Adventures, authored by Hidenori Kusaka and published by Shogakukan.

In Super Smash Bros. Ultimate, it can be summoned with the Pokéball item, in which it will try to grab and damage a fighter when summoned. Mimikyu also appears as a Spirit in this game. If its Spirit is equipped, the fighter will start the match with a Death's Scythe.

Reception

Critical response 
In the Pokémon of the Year poll held by The Pokémon Company, Mimikyu was voted the most popular Generation VII Pokémon, receiving 99,077 votes, placing it 3rd overall in the competition.

Kotaku called Mimikyu the "most brilliant and heartbreaking" Pokémon that Game Freak had created, noting the Pokémon's large Internet following. Catrina Dennis of Inverse also observed this following, stating that fans had grown "obsessed" over it and that it  "...pulled at players' heartstrings" .

Promotion 
Mimikyu items were sold in retail shops in Japan beginning on September 22, 2018. On October 8, 2018, it was announced that Bandai would release a Mimikyu plush doll in January of the following year. A special Ditto-Mimikyu plush, with the former Pokémon imitating the latter, was released alongside four other Ditto imitation stuffed toys.

In 2019, the Pokémon Company dedicated the month of October to Mimikyu, paying homage to "this lonely, terrifying Pokémon – who really just wants to snuggle". A Mimikyu costume for Pikachu was released on Pokémon Go for the 2019 Halloween Event.

In 2020, a gold, silver, and platinum necklace of Mimikyu was created by U-treasure. A Halloween Mimikyu themed meal was also released in the Japanese Pokémon Cafe during the same year. 

In 2021, an Ichiban Kuji for Mimikyu featured a tea and sweats theme. In 2022, an Ichiban Kuji for Mimikyu featured a café theme. On December 7th, 2022, Peach John released a collaboration with Pokémon that included a Mimikyu themed 3-piece set lounge set.{{

References

External links 
 Mimikyu on Bulbapedia
 Mimikyu on Pokemon.com
 【公式】『ポケットモンスター サン・ムーン』 ミミッキュのうた (Official "Pokémon Sun and Moon" Song of Mimikyu)

Pokémon species
Video game characters introduced in 2016
Ghost characters in video games
Fictional fairies and sprites
Fictional impostors
Fictional characters who can manipulate darkness or shadows
Fictional characters who can manipulate light
Demon characters in video games
Video game characters who use magic
Fictional characters who can teleport